Jimmy Carmichael (22 March 1900 – 4 January 1990) was a Scotland international rugby union player.

Rugby Union career

Amateur career

He played rugby union for Watsonians.

Provincial career

He played for Edinburgh District in the 1920 inter-city match.

International career

He received 3 caps for Scotland in 1921.

Family

He was born to Duncan Smith Carmichael (1870-1933) and Jane Ann Jackson Howden (1873-1947). He married Vera Margaret Wood Hawks (1900-1990) in 1926.

His son Dennis also played for Watsonians. He is a noted administrator for the club, a former president, and Team Secretary and Honorary President. He won a Lifetime Achievement Award by the SRU.

References

1900 births
1990 deaths
Scottish rugby union players
Edinburgh District (rugby union) players
Scotland international rugby union players
Watsonians RFC players
Rugby union wings